Napeogenes sylphis is a species of butterfly of the family Nymphalidae. It is found in South America.

The larvae of subspecies N. s. acreana have been recorded feeding on Lycianthes species.

Subspecies
N. s. sylphis (Bolivia and Peru)
N. s. acreana d'Almeida, 1958 (Brazil)
N. s. caucayensis Fox & Real, 1971 (Colombia)
N. s. corena (Hewitson, 1861) (Ecuador, Colombia, Brazil and Peru)
N. s. ercilla (Hewitson, 1858) (Brazil)
N. s. ehu Brevignon, 2007 (French Guiana)
N. s. ithra (Hewitson, 1855) (Brazil)
N. s. potaronus Kaye, 1905 (Guyana)
N. s. rindgei Fox & Real, 1971 (Peru)
N. s. thira (Hewitson, 1874) (Bolivia and Peru)

References

Butterflies described in 1844
Ithomiini
Fauna of Brazil
Nymphalidae of South America
Taxa named by Félix Édouard Guérin-Méneville